The 1979 Holsten Lager International was a non-ranking snooker tournament held on one occasion in January 1979 in Slough, England.

The tournament had an unusual format. There were sixteen players in a straight knockout but the first round was decided by aggregate scores over four frames and the second by aggregate over six frames. The semi finals and final were ‘Best of 11’ and ‘Best of 21’ respectively.

The quarter final between John Spencer and Cliff Thorburn is how the event is best remembered. In the afternoon session, Spencer made the first ever 147 in a professional tournament. As it was the afternoon, the TV cameras were not running and due to oversize pockets the break was never officially ratified for record purposes. Spencer went on to beat Graham Miles 11–7 in the final.

Main draw

References

1979 in snooker
1979 in English sport